Tel Aviv City Hall ( Beit Iriyat Tel Aviv) is the municipal government center of Tel Aviv, Israel. It houses the mayor's office, the meeting chambers and offices of the Tel Aviv City Council.

History

The Tel Aviv municipality was initially located on Rothschild Boulevard. When more office space was needed, the municipality rented a hotel on Bialik Street, near the home of national poet Chaim Nachman Bialik, which had been built by the Skora family in 1924. The hotel had opened for business in 1925 but was deemed unprofitable due to the lack of tourists. In 1928, the municipality bought the hotel. Later, it housed a courthouse on the ground floor.

A new city hall was designed in the 1950s by architect Menachem Cohen, in the Brutalist style. The large plaza at the foot of the building, first named Kings of Israel Square and renamed to Rabin Square in 1995, was designed as a central area for public events and ceremonies. It is located on Ibn Gabirol Street.

In 1972, the old Skora building was converted into a museum for the history of Tel Aviv. In 2006, the municipality hired an architectural firm to carry out restoration work on the building.

The building has been used many times to display solidarity with other countries in times of disasters and terrorist attacks. In 2017, the city hall was lit up in Egyptian flag following the Minya bus attack and the Spanish flag after the Barcelona attacks.In 2023, it was lit up in solidarity with Turkey after the 2023 Turkey-Syria earthquakes.

References

External links
 
 

Buildings and structures in Tel Aviv
Government buildings completed in 1966
Brutalist architecture in Israel
City and town halls in Israel